John Heling Shen-Sampas serves as the literary executor for the estate of Jack Kerouac.

Since 2017, Shen-Sampas has been, in partnership with the University of Massachusetts Lowell, preserving and archiving the entirety of Jack Kerouac's works and the history of the literary estate management. His on-going effort to support the preservation of  Kerouac's studies includes a donation of the most comprehensive archive on Kerouac to date and financial sponsorship in the archival work of the collection.

Shen-Sampas serves on the board of the Jack and Stella Kerouac Center for the Public Humanities.

Shen-Sampas founded the Kerouac Society.  Shen-Sampas published and exhibited a large swath of Kerouac’s paintings in Europe.

Shen-Sampas earned his J.D. from  the University of Michigan Law School and M.B.A. from Columbia Business School. He received his B.S. in Applied Mathematics and M.S. in Operations Research from Columbia University.

References

Jack Kerouac
Living people
Columbia University alumni
University of Michigan Law School alumni
University of Massachusetts Lowell people
Year of birth missing (living people)